Maria Amalia "Mia" Green (14 April 1870 – 24 June 1949) was a Swedish photographer who has a park in her memory in Haparanda. She documented history in that area, particularly during the First World War. She was also involved in the local suffrage association and in creating care for the elderly.

Family 
She had two children, Maria Lundmark and Lennart Green. She was the grandmother of Marika Green and the great-grandmother of the actress Eva Green. The surname "Green" [ˈɡɾeːn] is Swedish, derived from the Swedish word "gren", which means "tree branch". It does not originate from the English word "green", which is "grön" in Swedish.

Life
She was born in Lundmark in Nor, Roslags-Bro Uppland on 14 April 1870. Green died in Haparanda Parish on 24 June 1949. 

She became a photographer in Haparanda, which is in Sweden but close to the border with Finland. Haparanda marked a point where the Swedish and Russian rail systems came very close to each other. Although her town was small it became very significant during the first world war where thousands of children, invalid prisoners of war and thousands of tonnes of mail was exchanged.

Photography 

She was known for the photographic record that she created during the first world war which included Red Cross sisters and war invalids. In 1918 she recorded a typhus outbreak in Haparanda.

One of her students was Hilda Augusta Larsson, who was Swedish but established a photography business in Finland.

Her pictures recorded notable politicians, opera singers and nobility as well as revolutionaries, spies and smugglers, but she is also remembered for the work she did in establishing care for the elderly.

Political 
Green was also a women's rights activist, heading the Haparanda branch of the National Association for Women's Suffrage (LKPR) which was founded in 1907. In 1913, she served as a member of the organization's central executive. Under the local branch, efforts were also made to help the many refugees passing through the town. On the political front, she was elected to the town council, representing the conservative party.

Legacy 
A memorial was created in her memory in her home parish with a bust by Lars Stålnacke.

References

Further reading

External links
 

1870 births
1949 deaths
19th-century Swedish photographers
20th-century Swedish photographers
Swedish suffragists